The Chemical Industry Medal is an annual American award given to an industrial chemist by the Society of Chemical Industry (SCI). The medal has been awarded since 1933, when it replaced the Grasselli Medal. It was initially given to  "a person making a valuable application of chemical research to industry. Primary consideration shall be given to applications in the public interest." As of 1945, the criterion became "a person who ...  has rendered conspicuous service to applied chemistry." More recently it has been awarded "for contributions toward the growth of the chemical industry."

Recipients
 Source: SCI Chemical Industry Medal Past Winners
1933 	James G. Vail, Philadelphia Quartz Company
1934 	Floyd G. Metzger, Air Reduction
1935 	Edward R. Weidlein,  Mellon Institute
1936 	Walter S. Landis, American Cyanamid
1937 	Evan J. Crane,  Chemical Abstracts
1938 	John V. N. Dorr,  Dorr
1939 	Robert E. Wilson, Standard Oil of Indiana, PanAmerican Petroleum
1941 	Elmer K. Bolton,  Dupont
1942 	Harrison Howe, ACS
1943 	John Grebe, Dow
1944 	Bradley Dewey, Dewey & Almy
1945 	Sidney Dale Kirkpatrick, Chemical & Metallurgical
1946 	Willard H. Dow, Dow
1947 	George W. Merck,  Merck
1948 	James A. Rafferty, 	Union Carbide
1949 	William B. Bell,  American Cyanamid
1950 	William M. Rand, Monsanto
1951 	Ernest W. Reid, Corn Products
1952 	J. R. Donald, Crawford H. Greenewalt, Dupont
1953 	Charles S. Munson, 	Air Reduction
1954 	Ernest H. Volwiler, Abbot
1955 	Joseph George Davidson, Union Carbide
1956 	Robert Lindley Murray, Hooker Electrochemical
1957 	Clifford Rassweiler, Johns Manville
1958 	Fred J. Emmerich, Allied
1959 	Harry B. Mcclure, Union Carbide
1960 	Hans Stauffer,  Stauffer
1961 	William Edward Hanford, Olin Mathieson
1962 	Kenneth H. Klipstein, American Cyanamid
1963 	Max Tishler, Merck
1964 	Leland I. Doan,  Dow
1965 	Ralph Connor, Rohm and Haas
1966 	Monroe E. Spaght, Shell
1967 	Chester M. Brown, 	Allied
1968 	Harold W. Fisher,  Standard Oil of New Jersey
1969 	Charles B. McCoy, Dupont
1970 	William H. Lycan, Johnson & Johnson
1971 	Carroll A. Hochwalt, Thomas & Hochwalt, Monsanto
1972 	Jesse Werner,  Gaf
1973 	Ralph Landau,  Scientific Design
1974 	Carl A. Gerstacker, Dow
1975 	Leonard P. Pool, Air Products & Chemicals
1976 	Harold E. Thayer, Mallinckrodt
1977 	F. Perry Wilson, Union Carbide
1978 	Jack B. St. Clair,  Shell
1979 	Irving S. Shapiro, Dupont
1980 	Edward Donley, Air Products
1981 	Thomas W. Mastin, 	Lubrizol
1982 	H. Barclay Morley, Stauffer
1983 	Paul F. Orrefice, Dow
1984 	James Affleck,  American Cyanamid
1985 	Louis Fernandez, Monsanto
1986 	Edward G. Jefferson,  Dupont
1987 	Edwin C. Holmer, Exxon
1988  	Vincent L. Gregory Jr.,  Rohm and Haas
1989 	Richard E. Heckert, Dupont
1990 	George J. Sella Jr., American Cyanamid
1991 	Dexter F. Baker,  Air Products
1992 	H. Eugene McBrayer, Exxon
1993 	W. H. Clark, Nalco
1994 	Keith R. McKennon, Dow Corning
1995 	Robert D. Kennedy, Union Carbide
1996 	John W. Johnstone Jr., Olin
1997 	J. Roger Hirl, Occidental Chemical
1998 	Edgar S. Woolard, Jr., Dupont
1999 	J. Lawrence Wilson,	Rohm and Haas
2000 	Vincent A. Calarco,	Crompton
2001 	William S. Stavropoulos, Dow Chemical
2002 	Earnest W. Deavenport Jr.,	Eastman Chemical
2003 	Whitson Sadler, Solvay
2004 	Thomas E. Reilly, Reilly Industries
2005 	Daniel S. Sanders, ExxonMobil & Company
2006 	Jon Huntsman, Sr., Huntsman Corporation
2007 	Raj Gupta, Rohm and Haas
2008 	Dennis H. Reilley, Praxair
2009 	Jeffrey M. Lipton, Nova Chemicals
2010 	Michael E. Campbell, Arch Chemicals, Inc
2011 	J. Brian Ferguson, Eastman Chemical
2012 	David N. Weidman, Celanese
2013 	Andrew Liveris, Dow Chemical
2014   Sunil Kumar, International Speciality Products
2015   Stephen D. Pryor, President of ExxonMobil Chemical 
2016   James L. Gallogly,	LyondellBasell
2017 Andreas C. Kramvis, Honeywell
 2018, Cal Dooley,	American Chemistry Council
 2019, Neil A. Chapman, Exxon Mobil Corporation

See also

 List of chemistry awards

External links
SCI Chemical Industry Medal Past Winners
Society of Chemical Industry

References

Chemistry awards
American science and technology awards
Awards established in 1933
1933 establishments in the United States